Baby Goodbye may refer to:

 "Baby Goodbye" (E.M.D. song)
 "Baby Goodbye" (Friday Hill song)